The 2018 WNBA All-Star Game was an exhibition basketball game played on July 28, 2018. The Minnesota Lynx hosted the WNBA All-Star Game for the first time.

Rosters

Selection
On June 5, the WNBA announced that 2018 would have a new roster selection format for the All-Star Game.  Fans, WNBA players, head coaches, sports writers and broadcasters would all be able to vote for All Stars.  Fans could vote for 10 players, while the groups vote for 22 players (9 guards and 13 front court players).   Players and coaches cannot vote for members of their own team.  Voting began on June 19, 2018 at 2 PM EDT, and ended on July 12, 2018 at 11:59 PM EDT.

The voting will be weighted as follows: 

Players were not allowed to vote for their teammates. Head coaches could not vote for players on their own team. The top 22 players receiving votes based on this weighting would be selected to the All-Star Game.  There would not be a restriction on number of players from one conference.  The top two vote-getters would be captains of the two All-Star teams and select their teams from the pool of remaining 20 players.  The 22 All-Stars were revealed on July 17, 2018.  Rosters were revealed on July 19, 2018, during ESPN2's coverage of the Washington Mystics at the Dallas Wings.

Head coaches
The head coaches of the two teams will be the head coaches from the two WNBA teams with the best records following games on July 13. On July 12, 2018 the two teams with the best records were determined when the Dallas Wings defeated the Los Angeles Sparks.  The Seattle Storm had the best record in the league and the Phoenix Mercury had the second best.  Therefore, Dan Hughes was to coach the team captained by the highest All-Star vote getter (Team Delle Donne), and Sandy Brondello would be the coach of the team captained by the second highest All-Star vote getter (Team Parker).

All-Star pool 
The players for the All-Star Game were selected by the voting process described above. The 22 players that would participate in the All-Star Game were announced on July 17, 2018, on Sportscenter. Maya Moore and Elena Delle Donne were the two leading vote-getters and would be the captains of the two All-Star teams. Moore decline the role of captain, and president Lisa Borders named Candace Parker as the replacement captain, due to Parker being the next-leading vote-getter. The selections were led by the Western Conference, with 16 selections, while the Eastern Conference had six players selected.

Final rosters

 Rosters as of July 25, 2018. Team rosters were announced on July 19, whereas the starters for each team were announced on July 27.
 Nneka Ogwumike was unable to play due to illness.
 Rebekkah Brunson was selected as Nneka Ogwumike's replacement.

Game

Three-Point Contest
On July 24, 2018, it was announced that the Three-Point Contest would return during halftime of the All-Star Game. For the second year in a row, the WNBA will donate $10,000 to a charity of the winner's choice.

Rules
The Three-Point Shootout is a two-round, timed competition in which five shooting locations are positioned around the three-point arc. Four racks contain four WNBA balls (each worth one point) and one “money” ball (worth two points). The fifth station is a special “all money ball” rack, which each participant can place at any of the five locations. Every ball on this rack is worth two points. The players have one minute to shoot as many of the 25 balls as they can. The two competitors with the highest scores in the first round advance to the championship round.

Results
Allie Quigly beat Kayla McBride in a tie breaker round, winning the 2018 WNBA three point contest.

References

WNBA All-Star Game
Women's National Basketball Association All-Star Game
WNBA All-Star Game